Meerbusch is a town in Rhein-Kreis Neuss, North Rhine-Westphalia, Germany. It has been an incorporated town since 1970. Meerbusch is the municipality with the most income millionaires in North Rhine-Westphalia.

Geography
Meerbusch is a town in the Lower Rhine region of northwestern Germany. It is located between Krefeld and Düsseldorf near Düsseldorf Airport and Messe Düsseldorf. Other neighbouring towns and cities are Duisburg, Kaarst, Willich and Neuss. The total area is divided into eight villages of varying sizes which used to be independent communes before the municipality was founded.

Economy
Many companies have set up offices in the town's several light industrial estates. Most significantly, IMAV-Hydraulik GmbH has its headquarters in "Breite Straße" and Epson, Ernst-Rademacher GmbH, Nedap, ATHLON, BOBST GROUP and Kyocera Mita have settled in the business park at Mollsfeld, part of a large development called "Mollsfeld North". Thanks to its excellent motorway connections (A57 and A44) the town boasts several business parks and light industrial estates, also featuring logistics operations. The "Fritz-Wendt-Straße" industrial estate in Strümp was developed because of the grinding technology company Wendt GmbH. The "In der Loh" business park in Lank is home to businesses in the SME sector such as Abit AG and KUPP GmbH, and features modern architecture in "Robert-Bosch-Straße".

Culture
The town sees frequent theatre plays and music events staged at the Forum Wasserturm, based in Lank Latum, predominantly featuring the comedy and satire genres. Dieter Nuhr and Frank Lüdecke have become regular artists over recent years. Each winter a popular folcloristic stage play is being performed in front of a 6,000+ strong audience.

Notable people
Florian Schneider (1947–2020), musician, leader of Kraftwerk
Hansi Kürsch (born 1966), musician
Ekaterina Moré (born 1976), Russian painter and author; lives here
Grim104 (born 1988), rapper

Twin towns – sister cities

Meerbusch is twinned with:
 Fouesnant, France
 Shijōnawate, Japan

References

External links

Meerbusch official website
Information about Meerbusch
Meerbusch Alte Kirchturm

Towns in North Rhine-Westphalia
Populated places on the Rhine
Rhein-Kreis Neuss